Litoria is a genus of hylid tree frogs, sometimes collectively referred to as Australasian treefrogs, that are native to Australia, the Bismarck Archipelago, the Solomon Islands, New Guinea, the Lesser Sunda Islands, and the Moluccan Islands. They are distinguishable from other tree frogs by the presence of horizontal irises, no pigmentation of the eyelids, and their distribution east and south from Wallacea. Over one hundred species are recognised and new species are still being added, such as the Pinocchio frog discovered in 2008 and described in 2019.

The species within the genus Litoria are extremely variable in appearance, behaviour, and habitat. The appearance, behaviour, and habitat of each frog is usually linked. The small, darkly coloured frogs are generally terrestrial, and never, or infrequently, climb. The larger, green species are usually arboreal and some only venture to the ground to breed.

Species 

While some former species have been moved to the genera Nyctimystes and Ranoidea, the following species are recognised within the genus Litoria:

 L. adelaidensis – slender tree frog
 L. albolabris – Wandolleck's white-lipped tree frog
 L. amboinensis – Horst's tree frog
 L .amnicola – Raja Ampat torrent tree frog
 L. angiana – Angiana tree frog
 L. aplini
 L. arfakiana – Arfakiana tree frog
 L. aurifera – Kimberley rockhole frog
 L. axillaris – Kimberley rocket frog
 L. balatus 
 L. becki – Beck's tree frog
 L. biakensis 
 L. bibonius 
 L. bicolor – northern dwarf tree frog
 L. bulmeri –  Bulmer's tree frog
 L. burrowsi – Tasmanian tree frog
 L. capitula – Samlakki tree frog
 L. chloristona
 L. chloronota – Arfak Mountain tree frog
 L. chrisdahli 
 L. christianbergmanni
 L. congenita – Yule Island tree frog
 L. contrastens – Barabuna tree frog
 L. cooloolensis – Cooloola sedge frog, Cooloola tree frog
 L. coplandi – Copland's rock frog
 L. darlingtoni – Darlington's Madang tree frog
 L. dentata – bleating tree frog, Keferstein's tree frog
 L. dorsalis – dwarf rocket frog
 L. dorsivena – eastern mountains tree frog
 L. electrica – buzzing tree frog
 L. eurynastes
 L. everetti – Everett's tree frog
 L. ewingii – brown tree frog
 L. fallax – eastern dwarf tree frog
 L. flavescens 
 L. freycineti – Freycinet's frog
 L. gasconi 
 L. havina
 L. hilli 
 L. humboldtorum 
 L. inermis – bumpy rocket frog
 L. iris – Western Highland tree frog
 L. jervisiensis – Jervis Bay tree frog
 L. latopalmata – broad-palmed frog
 L. leucova – West Sepik tree frog
 L. littlejohni – Littlejohn's tree frog
 L. lodesdema
 L. longicrus – Wendessi tree frog
 L. longirostris – long-snouted frog, sharp-snouted frog, scrub rocket frog
 L. majikthise
 L. mareku
 L. megalops 
 L. meiriana – rockhole frog
 L. microbelos – javelin frog
 L. micromembrana – Nodugl tree frog
 L. modica – Oruge tree frog
 L. mucro
 L. multiplica – Kassam tree frog
 L. mystax – Moaif tree frog
 L. nasuta – striped rocket frog
 L. nigrofrenata – bridled frog
 L. nigropunctata – black-dotted tree frog
 L. oenicolen – Trauna River tree frog
 L. ollauro
 L. olongburensis – wallum sedge frog, Olongburra frog, sharp-snouted reed frog
 L. pallida – pale frog
 L. paraewingi – plains brown tree frog (also red cryptic treefrog, Victoria frog)
 L. peronii – Peron's tree frog, emerald-speckled tree frog, laughing tree frog, maniacal cackle frog
 L. personata – masked frog
 L. pinocchio – Pinocchio frog
 L. pratti 
 L. pronimia
 L. prora – Efogi tree frog
 L. pygmaea – Geelvink pygmy tree frog
 L. quadrilineata – lined tree frog
 L. quiritatus – screaming tree frog
 L. revelata – revealed frog, whirring tree frog
 L. richardsi 
 L. rivicola 
 L. rothii – Roth's tree frog
 L. rubella – desert tree frog
 L. rubrops
 L. scabra
 L. singadanae 
 L. spaldingi 
 L. spartacus 
 L. staccato – chattering rock frog
 L. timida – Menemsorae tree frog
 L. tornieri – Tornier's frog
 L. tyleri – Tyler's tree frog, southern laughing tree frog
 L. umarensis – Umar tree frog
 L. umbonata – Baliem River Valley tree frog
 L. verae – Vera's tree frog
 L. verreauxii –  whistling tree frog, Verreaux's tree frog 
 L. viranula
 L. vivissimia  – montane Pinocchio frog
 L. vocivincens – Brown River tree frog
 L. wapogaensis
 L. watjulumensis – Watjulum frog
 L. watsoni – Watson's tree frog
 L. wisselensis – Wissel Lakes tree frog
 L. wollastoni – highland tree frog

References

Bibliography

Frogs of Australia. Litoria genus . Amphibian Research Centre.
 Frogs Australia Network search: Litoria
Cogger, H.G. 1979. Reptiles & Amphibians of Australia. A. H. & A. W. REED PTY LTD 
 Tyler, Michael J. 1992. Encyclopedia of Australian Animals: Frogs. Angus & Robertson. 

 
Amphibian genera
Taxa named by Johann Jakob von Tschudi